The International Music Camp is a summer youth camp held annually at the International Peace Garden on the North Dakota-Manitoba border.  The camp offers week-long and month-long intensive programs in the fine arts, including piano, choir and painting.

External links
International Music Camp website

Summer camps in North Dakota
Music of North Dakota